Francis Patrick Carroll (born 9 September 1930), a retired Australian archbishop, was the fifth Roman Catholic Archbishop of Canberra–Goulburn, serving between 1983 until his retirement in 2006. Prior to his election as archbishop, Carroll served as Bishop of Wagga Wagga between 1968 and 1983. Carroll served as president of the Australian Catholic Bishops Conference between 2000 and 2006.

Early career
Carroll was born in Ganmain, New South Wales, the second of seven children of Patrick and Rose Carroll.  He was ordained a priest in 1954 in St Brendan's Church, Ganmain. After service in Griffith and Albury, Carroll was appointed to the role of Assistant Diocesan Inspector of Schools and became Director of Catholic Education for the Diocese of Wagga Wagga in 1965.

Episcopate
In 1968 he was appointed the third Bishop of Wagga Wagga by Pope Paul VI.  He has been a spiritual director to the Cursillo movement and was a member of the first National Catholic Education Commission (from 1969 to 1971). In 1974, he was appointed to the International Catechetical Commission, an appointment he held for 18 years. He was the Australian representative at the Synod of Bishops on Catechesis in 1977 and was the first chairperson of the National Catholic Education Commission from 1974 to 1978, remaining a member until 1988.

In 1983 he was appointed Archbishop of CanberraGoulburn with his seat at St Christopher's Cathedral, Manuka, Australian Capital Territory. In 1986, he welcomed John Paul II on his arrival in Australia.

Popularly known as "Father Francis", he served the Church in Canberra for 23 years. The development of Catholic schools in the archdiocese is a significant part of his legacy, in addition to his role in helping to bring about government aid to private schools in Australia.

He was also the first Australian bishop to call a diocesan synod since the Second Vatican Council. It was held in Canberra during 1989 with a subsequent synod in 2004. The synod's recommendations accepted by the archbishop were the formation of a commission for women, a commitment to resource and support the Catholic youth ministry team for a period of five years, the embracing of the concept of encouraging parishes to implement family-based sacramental programs and calling on parishes to consider the employment of pastoral associates possibly in conjunction with neighbouring parishes. However, the synod's proposals were not without their detractors.

In 2001, Carroll signed a decree that reduced the holy days of obligation to Christmas, the Assumption and every Sunday as the days on which Catholics in Australia are obliged to attend Mass.

As president of the Australian Catholic Bishops' Conference he sought to find ways to meet the Church's challenge of a decline in priestly vocations, including considering married priests:

He also advocated for the extension of Australian visas for asylum seekers, particularly from Timor Leste. For over ten years, Carroll sought the creation of a special visa category for the East Timorese asylum seekers, most of whom are active members of the Catholic community and have lived in Australia. While this request was not approved by the Howard government, it triggered the personal intervention of the Minister for Immigration to grant permanent residency status to the asylum seekers where appropriate.

In August 2005, prior to attaining 75 years of age, Carroll submitted his resignation to Benedict XVI, which was accepted the following month, but he continued in the role until his replacement, Mark Coleridge, was appointed in June 2006.

Honours
He was awarded the Centenary Medal on 1 January 2001 for "Service to Australian Society through the Roman Catholic Church".

In February 2006, as a result if a public appeal, a scholarship was established to help students attend the Canberra campus of the Australian Catholic University. The Francis Carroll Scholarship provides financial support to students who relocate from rural or regional areas of the Archdiocese of CanberraGoulburn or the Diocese of Wagga Wagga to undertake an Education course at the Canberra campus. In May 2006, Carroll was awarded the Doctor of the University (Univ.D), honoris causa, the highest honour from the Australian Catholic University. The award recognised Carroll's contribution to Catholic education.

Carroll College Broulee, a Catholic High School on the south coast of NSW, was named after Carroll. The school opened in 1995.

References

Living people
1930 births
Roman Catholic archbishops of Canberra and Goulburn
Recipients of the Centenary Medal
People from the Riverina
Roman Catholic bishops of Wagga Wagga